Pat Mitchell (born January 20, 1943) was the first woman president and CEO of PBS and is a media executive. She is editorial director of TEDWomen.

Early life
Pat Mitchell graduated magna cum laude from the University of Georgia with bachelor's and master's degrees in English literature. Mitchell won a drama scholarship to attend college.

Career 
Pat Mitchell started her career as an English instructor at the University of Georgia and Virginia Commonwealth University. While she was teaching, a freelance article she wrote about student movements caught the eye of an editor at Look, a biweekly news magazine, which started her journalism career. Nine months later, in 1971, Look stopped publishing, and Mitchell, an unemployed single mother living in New York City with her young son, was advised to "try television." After several auditions, Mitchell landed a position at WBZ in Boston as a full-time television reporter.

Over the next three decades, she worked as a news reporter and news anchor, national talk show host and White House correspondent.  She also achieved notice behind the cameras as a creator and producer of documentaries and series, many of which focused on women. She was a co-host on the daily NBC daytime talk show America Alive! in 1978.

In the mid-80s, she left a position at NBC to establish an independent production company to create, produce and host the Emmy Award-winning daytime series, "Woman to Woman," which was the first national program produced and hosted by a woman. "Woman to Woman" also became the first television series to be added to the Schlesinger Library on the History of Women at Radcliffe College.

In 1992, Mitchell approached media entrepreneur Ted Turner about producing a documentary series on the history of women in America. The resulting 6-hour series, "A Century of Women," was broadcast in 1994 on Turner cable networks and received three Emmy award nominations. Turner convinced Mitchell to join Turner Broadcasting, and as president of Turner Original Productions and later the first president of CNN Productions, Mitchell produced hundreds of hours of documentaries and specials, many of which were awarded Emmys and Peabody Awards for Excellence and nominated for Academy Awards.

In 2000, Pat Mitchell left Turner Broadcasting when she was appointed the first woman president and CEO of PBS.  Mitchell left PBS in 2006. After departing PBS, Mitchell was appointed the President and CEO of the Paley Center for Media, an American cultural institution in New York.

In 2010, Mitchell launched TEDWomen, an annual three day conference under the umbrella of TED Talks. Mitchell became its editorial director, curator and host.  The conference, described as being "about the power of women and girls to be creators and change-makers," has included speakers including former presidential candidate Hillary Clinton, ex-Facebook COO Sheryl Sandberg and former House Speaker Nancy Pelosi.

In 2022, Mitchell was one of the producers of the documentary, "Refuge," which followed a Syrian Kurd, a former Klansman, and a town of refugees in Clarkston, Georgia. As of 2021, she was chair of the Sundance Institute and the Women's Media Center, and a trustee of the VDAY movement, the Skoll Foundation and the Acumen Fund.

Mitchell also advises foundations and corporations on issues of women's empowerment and leadership development as well as media and governance. She has taught at the University of Georgia, Virginia Commonwealth University, and at Harvard University's John F. Kennedy School of Government.

Mitchell is the chair emerita of the Women's Media Center and Sundance Institute boards, a founding board member of V-Day, a global movement to end violence against women and girls, a founding member of Green Cross International, a board member of
the George Foster Peabody Awards, a member of the board of the Skoll Fund and Acumen Fund, and a member of the Council on Foreign Relations, the International Academy of Television Arts and Sciences, and the International Women's Forum.

Awards and Honors 

Documentaries produced under Mitchell's direction have won more than 100 major awards, including 41 Emmy Awards, seven Peabody Awards and 35 CableACEs. She personally received a Prime-Time Emmy Award in 1996 for Survivors of the Holocaust on TBS, and was personally nominated for four other Prime-Time Emmys.

In 2008, Mitchell was inducted into the Broadcasting and Cable Hall of Fame. She was also named one of the Most Powerful Women in Hollywood by The Hollywood Reporter and featured in Fast Company’s special report, "The League of Extraordinary Women: 60 Influencers Who Are Changing the World."

In 2012, The Women's Media Center honored Mitchell with their first-annual Lifetime Achievement Award. Mitchell has also been recognized with the Sandra Day O'Connor Award for Leadership, and was honored by the Center for the Advancement of Women for her accomplishments and contributions in the world of communications in creating a more equitable society for women. She is also one of 12 Americans awarded the Bodley Medal from the Oxford University. Mitchell was appointed by House Minority Leader Nancy Pelosi as one of nine commissioners to develop a plan to build a National Women's History Museum in Washington, D.C. The commission delivered its report to Congress in the fall of 2016.

Personal life 

Mitchell and her husband, Scott Seydel, have six children and 13 grandchildren and reside in New York City and Atlanta, Georgia.

Becoming a Dangerous Woman 
Mitchell is the author of "Becoming a Dangerous Woman: Embracing Risk to Change the World" book, published by Seal Press.

References

External links 
 Pat Mitchell
 Pat Mitchell profile from The Paley Center for Media
 
 Pat Mitchell Video produced by Makers: Women Who Make America
Pat Mitchell: Becoming a Dangerous Woman: Embracing Risk to Change the World
TEDWomen Co-Founder Pat Mitchell on Becoming a Dangerous Woman. MediaVillage.com. July 24, 2019

1943 births
Living people
University of Georgia alumni
Harvard Kennedy School people
Television anchors from Boston